The Vijay for Best Lyricist is given by STAR Vijay as part of its annual Vijay Awards ceremony for Tamil  (Kollywood) films.

The list
Here is a list of the award winners and the films for which they won.

Nominations 
2007 Na. Muthukumar - "Balleilakka" (Sivaji)
Rohini - "Unnakul Naane" (Pachaikili Muthucharam)
Snehan - "Ariyaatha Vayasu" (Paruthiveeran)
Vaali - "Yaaro" (Chennai 600028)
Vairamuthu - "Kaatrin Mozhi" (Mozhi)
2008 Thamarai - "Nenjukkul Peidhidhum" (Vaaranam Aayiram)
Na. Muthukumar - "Mudhal Mazhai" (Bheema)
Vaali - "Kallai Mattum" (Dasavathaaram)
Vairamuthu - "Vaa Vaa" (Abhiyum Naanum)
2009 Na. Muthukumar - "Oru Kal Oru Kannadi" (Siva Manasula Sakthi)
Ilayaraaja - "Pitchai Paathiram" (Naan Kadavul)
Kabilan - "Karikalan" (Vettaikaaran)
Thamarai - "Oru Vetkam Varudhe" (Pasanga)
Vairamuthu - "Nenje Nenje" (Ayan)
2010 Vairamuthu - "Arima Arima" & "Kallikaatil" (Enthiran / Thenmerku Paruvakaatru)
Gangai Amaran - "Idhu Varai" (Goa)
Na. Muthukumar - "Aval Appadi Ondrum" (Angadi Theru)
Thamarai - "Mannipaaya" (Vinnaithaandi Varuvaayaa)
Yugabharathi - "Mynaa Mynaa" (Mynaa)
 2011 Vairamuthu - "Sara Sara" (Vaagai Sooda Vaa)
Dhanush - "Voda Voda" (Mayakkam Enna)
Madhan Karky - "Enamo Aedho" (Ko)
Na. Muthukumar - "Aariro" (Deiva Thirumagal)
Snehan - "Yathe Yathe" (Aadukalam)
 2012 Thamarai - "Kangal Neeye" (Muppozhudhum Un Karpanaigal)
 Dhanush - "Po Nee Po" (3)
 Gaana Bala - "Nadukadalula" (Attakathi)
 Na. Muthukumar - "Oru Paadhi" (Thaandavam)
 Yugabharathi - "Sollitalae" (Kumki)
 2013 Na. Muthukumar - "Dheivangal Ellam" (Kedi Billa Killadi Ranga)
 Kabilan, A. R. Rahman - "Innum Konja Neram" (Maryan)
 Madhan Karky - "Mannadacha Pandhu" (Gouravam)
 Vaali - "Ethir Neechal Adi" (Ethir Neechal)
 Vairamuthu - "Nenjukkule" (Kadal)
2014 Kabilan - "Aathangara Orathil" (Yaan)
Dhanush - "Amma Amma" (Velaiyilla Pattathari)
Na. Muthukumar - "Azhagu" (Saivam)
Vairamuthu - "Maatram Ondru" (Kochadaiiyaan)
Yugabharathi - "Manasula Soora Kaathu" (Cuckoo)

See also
 Tamil cinema
 Cinema of India

References

Lyricist